"Papa's Goods" is the thirteenth and final episode of the seventh season of Sons of Anarchy. Written and directed by series creator Kurt Sutter, it first aired on December 9, 2014 in the United States on FX and served as the series finale.

Plot
Jax is excommunicated from the M.C. by choice after killing Jury White and ties up loose ends by killing August Marks and Charles Barosky. Chibs then becomes President of SAMCRO and the club votes for Jax to meet "Mr. Mayhem" (execution), but allow him to leave by staging an escape. Jax leads law enforcement on a massive chase on the interstate and kills himself by crashing into a semi truck.

Reception
The review aggregator website Rotten Tomatoes reports an 88% approval rating with an average rating of 8.90/10, based on 17 reviews. The site's critical consensus reads: "A long, winding, and turbulent journey, similar to Sons of Anarchy itself, 'Papa's Goods' is a fitting end to Sutter's uncompromising vision of Jax and the SAMCRO gang." In a review by Diana Steenbergen for IGN, the series finale received a 9.5|10 rating; stating "Sons of Anarchy went out on a high note, managing to tie up the loose ends of the story in typically bloody fashion, while also delivering an emotionally charged goodbye to the characters. Jax attained a measure of redemption as he paid for his actions in a way that left his family – both his kids and the members of SAMCRO – with hope for a better life in the future. What more could you ask for?" Dalton Ross of Entertainment Weekly said of the episode: "The finale was a fitting and unpredictable final chapter to a season in which creator Kurt Sutter dared us to continue rooting for the main protagonist, even as that protagonist did terrible things." 

Christine Orlando of TV Fanatic said about the conclusion of the series: "When I finally saw an episode, I wouldn't dare miss another. At times horrifying, often gut wrenching but always entertaining, Sons of Anarchy will be missed." Meanwhile Leigh Kolb of Vulture said; "Papa's Goods" -- at almost two hours -- is a powerful end to seven seasons of revenge, lust, mayhem, glimmers of humor, and, perhaps most important, humanity.

References

Sons of Anarchy episodes
2014 American television episodes